The HKTDC Hong Kong Optical Fair is an Asian trade convention for optical products, organised by the Hong Kong Trade Development Council (HKTDC) and held annually in the Hong Kong Convention and Exhibition Centre.

The 2009 the fair attracted 535 exhibitors from 23 countries and regions, including group pavilions from the Chinese mainland, Germany, Italy, Japan, Korea, Singapore and Taiwan. Themed zones include Brand Name Gallery - stylish zone exclusively for brand name collections of eyewear; Retail & Shop Design, Equipment and Technology Section – features furniture, fittings and lighting, point-of-sale equipment and technology which are designed for effective retailing.

References 

Andrew Yui, 4 Sep 2009, Cdn Buying Mission to HK Optical Fair 2009 
ANFAO, 5 Nov 2009, Huge presence of italian companies at Hong Kong Optical Fair
Goldencube, 22 Nov 2008, All Eyes on Hong Kong Optical Fair Opening Today
Xu Xiaomin, 8 Sep 2004, China Daily, HK optical fair is quite a spectacle

External links 
 

Trade fairs in Hong Kong